The State Tobacco Monopoly Administration or China National Tobacco Corporation (commonly known as China Tobacco, CNTC) is a Chinese government agency responsible for tobacco regulation and a state-owned manufacturer of tobacco products, operated by the Ministry of Industry and Information Technology of China. It enjoys a virtual monopoly in China, which accounts for roughly 40% of the world's total consumption of cigarettes, and is the world's largest manufacturer of tobacco products measured by revenues. It exports a small proportion of its production, mostly to Asian markets.

Organization
CNTC is the same entity as the State Tobacco Monopoly Administration (STMA) of China, an agency of the Ministry of Industry and Information Technology. The organization is responsible for enforcing the tobacco monopoly in China, and operates as the state-owned enterprise China Tobacco for marketing, production, distribution, and sales of tobacco products. Branch offices of the company are affiliated under provincial bureaus of tobacco monopoly.

Although a national behemoth with 98% of the domestic market, the organization trickles down locally. China Tobacco contracts out orders to smaller, local factories. In turn these factories fill orders and deliver them for distribution to China Tobacco's distribution chain. The smaller local factories pay a sort of tax to China Tobacco, but keep much of their profit. In turn, retail distributors buy cigarettes from China Tobacco, and the profits realized from those sales is in turn taxed by the State Tobacco Monopoly Administration.

Regulation
Advertising in print, radio, and television has been banned in China, and outdoor ads require prior approval provided they are not in one of nearly 100 local jurisdictions where outdoor tobacco ads are banned. These restrictions have forced China National into a strategy that harkens back to the 60's and 70's in the United States; with "cigarette girls", attractive women dressed in brand logos, handing out samples, lighters, and promotional material in front of clubs and bars. Another form of circumvention is printing outdoor advertisements in the name of another entity, the latter's name being clearly printed on the material. For example, the Hongtashan brand mentioned above has recently published their new climbing-themed advertisements through a Hongtashan Climbing Club.

There is also an anti-smoking lobby that is currently small but growing. In recent years, legislation from politicians have increased, banning smoking in many enclosed public areas. The press in China has not been silent either; numerous editorials criticizing smoking on everything from health to pollution have become more and more common place.

History

A major objective of China Tobacco and the STMA has been modernization. As recently as the 1980s, China's independent tobacco factories used outdated equipment to the extent that some processes were even carried out by hand. To accomplish their goal of modernization, the STMA allowed a small number of foreign companies into the country, in exchange for modern equipment. Though deals generally favored China, it allowed foreign companies to gain hard-to-come-by connections within China, and at high levels within the tobacco monopoly itself. The acceptance of foreign competition sparked a massive demand for tobacco production equipment in the 1990s, which has since slowed. However, major factories in China now count their production of cigarettes in tens of thousands per hour.

At the same time, China Tobacco has consolidated its factory base; currently, there are 130 cigarette factories in China, compared with a 1997 number of 180. To further their goal of consolidation China Tobacco plans to reduce the number of factories below 100 in the near future. This has led to increased efficiency within the industry, allowing for greater production and brand variety than were possible before. In fact, many brands made by only one or two small regional factories have been licensed to large factories, becoming nationwide successes.

Brands
China Tobacco, like many other tobacco companies, produces a plethora of brands – over 900, the largest of which, Hongtashan (Red Pagoda Hill), accounts for only 4% of total sales. China tobacco also markets premium brands, notably Chunghwa. Despite the existence of such premium brands premium cigarettes are uncommon in rural areas.

Trends in cigarette buying have not been lost of China either. In recent years several varieties of cigarettes targeted at women have been released (breaking a longstanding taboo). Varieties common internationally are just as common in China: Unfiltered, Filters, Lights, Ultra Lights, 100's, and 120's are all available in a variety of brands.

Foreign brands are to this day not unknown in China, since their introduction with the advent on China Tobacco and the STMA.  Marlboro, Camel, Kool, Lucky Strike, 555,  and a variety of other brands can all be found throughout major cities in China. However, while these cigarette brands are marketed as premium brands outside of China, within China these cigarettes are made locally under license or joint venture. Foreign sales make up only 3 percent of the Chinese market, yet accounts for 51 billion cigarettes every year.

See also
Smoking in China
World Health Organization Framework Convention on Tobacco Control
List of companies of China

References

External links

 
Companies established in 1982
Retail companies of China
1982 establishments in China
Government agencies of China
Ministry of Industry and Information Technology
Government-owned companies of China
Tobacco companies